Soane Lilo Foliaki (18 April 1933 − 24 December 2013) was the third Roman Catholic bishop of the Roman Catholic Diocese of Tonga.

Education 
Soane was educated at St Patrick's College, Silverstream. He graduated the University of Hull, and achieved a degree in mathematics.

Priesthood 
He was ordained to the priesthood on 21 July 1955, Foliaki was named bishop of the Roman Catholic Diocese of Tonga, Tonga on 10 June 1994 and retired on 18 April 2008.

Death 
He died in Nuku‘alofa on December 24, 2013. His funeral was held at St Peter Chanel’s church, Clover Park, New Zealand on December 29, 2013.

References

  The Most Reverend Soane Foliaki, s.m. Emeritus Bishop of Tonga

1933 births
2013 deaths
People from Tongatapu
20th-century Roman Catholic bishops in Tonga
21st-century Roman Catholic bishops in Tonga
Roman Catholic bishops of Tonga
New Zealand expatriates in Tonga
Expatriate bishops